Otto Fredrik Peterson (ca 1672 Stockholm  - September, 1729 London) was a Swedish artist and goldsmith who specialised in miniature and enamel painting.

He settled in London in 1709. Here he was apprenticed to Charles Boit who had been born in Stockholm to French parents.

Gallery

References

1729 deaths
1672 births